Ghetto Bootleg was a set of unreleased tracks and remixes that Fannypack released  on its Web site in 2005. There were originally only 1,000 copies available, but, in 2008, Tommy Boy Entertainment officially released the album.

Track listing

References

2005 albums
FannyPack albums
Tommy Boy Records albums